The Annual Latvian Music Recording Award is the annual award for the best Latvian musicians. The award was established in 1995 (for music on 1994) under the name Mikrofona Gada Balva (Microphone of the Year Award) and renamed since 1997 (for year of 1996). It was dubbed "the Latvian Grammy".

Awards by year
2010:
2011:
2012:

References

Latvian music awards